Ember Records was a British independent record label established by Jeffrey Kruger.

1950s to 1960s
Ember Records was founded in the late 1950s, by avid jazz fan Jeffrey Kruger, owner of the Flamingo Jazz Club. At the time, the British music industry was largely dominated by four major record companies (EMI, Decca, Pye and Philips) who, thanks to the lack of a national popular music radio station, dominated the airwaves by buying slots on Radio Luxembourg. Therefore, the only way independent record labels could achieve any success was by focusing on specialist genres.

Kruger realised that considerable success could be gained if, rather than focusing on one specific musical genre, he instead focused on a plethora of them. Releases under the jazz, pop, R&B, beat, soul, rockabilly, and other genres followed, and Kruger started to establish Ember as a major independent force in the UK. As Kruger explained:

The first major achievement and breakthrough for the label came when Kruger realised the rising demand for American music acts in Britain and that some popular American labels had not yet had a publishing deal in the UK, despite the major British labels already having deals with the most important ones. Kruger flew out to the US and made deals with, amongst others, 20th Century Fox (a major coup for an independent at the time), Sam Phillips, Harry Simeone Chorale’s ‘Onward Christian Soldiers’ label and Syd Nathan, boss of King and Federal Records in Ohio.

As Kruger recalled:

Becoming the first British label to set up its own distribution and pressing facilities helped Ember cement their place in the industry. By 1963, Ember had built up a roster of UK artists such as Matt Monro, the Dale Sisters, Grant Tracy and the Sunsets, and the duo John Shakespeare and Ken Hawker (recording as Carter, Lewis & the Southerners). The next big break came when composer, producer and arranger John Barry left EMI to join Kruger. During his time with Ember, he scored hits with pioneering folk duo Chad & Jeremy, and "Christine" by "Miss X" (Joyce Blair), a song which referred to the Profumo scandal.

As the decade wore on, the label continued to release records from across the musical spectrum, from film and TV themes such as the Liars (which established a young Nyree Dawn Porter), to the soul 45 RPM singles for which the label became renowned. These featured acts such as The Casinos, the Checkmates and Lou Lawton, Stax hitmakers the Bar-Kays, King Curtis and the Pac-Keys.

On the recommendation of John Abbey, who set up the subsidiary soul label Speciality where some of those previous releases first appeared, Kruger gave a debut to  Glen Campbell, the man who would go on to become Ember’s biggest success. Despite a considerable investment from Kruger, however, they struggled to achieve success, at least initially.

It was around this time that the label became the first British independent label to have three of its singles at the top of the American charts.

1970s to present
In the early 1970s, the label released recordings by Julie Rogers and Susan Maughan, and helped the career of Avengers actress Linda Thorson, in a similar fashion to what had happened with Twiggy a few years earlier.

In 1979, after Kruger had continued to put out a substantial number of soul releases by artists such as Ed Robinson, Tony and the Tyrones and golden oldies such as Gladys Knight, as well as new albums by PJ Proby and Johnny Otis, the label entered a less active period. By this stage, Kruger was involved with a number of other businesses in the music industry, being a concert promoter among other activities, and felt he could no longer meet the time restraints of running a label.

In 2009, Fantastic Voyage, a subsidiary of the Future Noise record label, started releasing a series of albums focused on the various genres Ember had promoted. This was to coincide with the fiftieth anniversary of the first Ember release and the thirtieth anniversary of the last. In 2016, the Ember catalogue moved to Cherry Red Records in the UK.

Jeffrey Kruger died in Florida in May 2014, aged 83.

References

British independent record labels
British jazz record labels